Olga Edna Purviance (October 21, 1895 – January 13, 1958) was an American actress of the silent film era. She was the leading lady in many of Charlie Chaplin's early films and in a span of eight years, she appeared in over 30 films with him.

Life and career

1895–1913: Early life
Edna Purviance was born in October 21,1895, in Paradise Valley, Nevada, United States of America, to English immigrant Louisa Wright Davey and American vintner to the western mining camps Madison (Matt) Gates Purviance. When she was three, the family moved to Lovelock, Nevada, where they assumed ownership of a hotel. Her parents divorced in 1902, and her mother later married Robert Nurnberger, a German plumber. Growing up, Purviance was a talented pianist.

She left Lovelock in 1913 and moved in with her married sister Bessie while attending business college in San Francisco.

1914–1927: Film career

In 1915, Purviance was working as a secretary in San Francisco when actor and director Charlie Chaplin was working on his second film with Essanay Studios, working out of Niles, California, 28 miles (45 km) southeast of San Francisco, in Southern Alameda County. He was looking for a leading lady for A Night Out. One of his associates noticed Purviance at a Tate's Café in San Francisco and thought she should be cast in the role. Chaplin arranged a meeting with her, but he was concerned that she might be too serious for comedic roles. Purviance still won the role.

Chaplin and Purviance were romantically involved during the making of his Essanay, Mutual, and First National films of 1915 to 1917. The romance ended suddenly when Purviance read a newspaper report of Chaplin having married 16-year-old Mildred Harris. 

Purviance appeared in 33 of Chaplin's productions, including the 1921 The Kid. Her last credited appearance in a Chaplin film, A Woman of Paris, was also her first leading role. The film was not a success and effectively ended Purviance's career. She appeared in two more films: Sea Gulls, also known as A Woman of the Sea (which Chaplin never released) and Éducation de Prince, a French film released in 1927.

1927–1958: Retirement and later years
For more than 30 years afterward, Edna Purviance lived quietly outside Hollywood. Purviance married John Squire, a Pan-American Airlines pilot, in 1938. They remained married until his death in 1945. 

Chaplin kept Purviance on his payroll. She received a small monthly salary from Chaplin's film company until she got married, and the payments resumed after her husband's death. "How could I forget Edna?" Chaplin responded to an interviewer after her death. "She was with me when it all began."

Death
On January 13, 1958, Edna Purviance died from throat cancer at the Motion Picture & Television Country House and Hospital in Woodland Hills, California. Edna was 62 years old.  Her remains are interred at Grand View Memorial Park Cemetery in Glendale, California.

In popular culture
She was portrayed by Penelope Ann Miller in the film Chaplin (1992) and by Katie Maguire in the film Madcap Mabel (2010).

In the TV series Peaky Blinders (series three, episode four), the character Tatiana Petrovna played by Gaite Jansen is said to resemble her.

Filmography

Short subjects

Feature films

References

Sources

External links

Edna Purviance—tribute and research site
Edna Purviance at Then & Now

1895 births
1958 deaths
20th-century American actresses
Actresses from Nevada
American film actresses
American people of English descent
American silent film actresses
Burials at Grand View Memorial Park Cemetery
Deaths from cancer in California
Deaths from throat cancer
People from Humboldt County, Nevada
Silent film comedians
20th-century American comedians
People from Lovelock, Nevada